Jeremy Swayman (born November 24, 1998), nicknamed "Sway", is an American professional ice hockey goaltender for the  Boston Bruins of the National Hockey League (NHL). The Bruins selected him in the fourth round, 111th overall, of the 2017 NHL Entry Draft.

Born and raised in Anchorage, Alaska, Swayman began attending Alaska Anchorage Seawolves men's ice hockey games as an infant with his father, and he took up goaltending at the age of five. After being cut from his local Kenai River Brown Bears, Swayman played one season of junior ice hockey with the Pikes Peak Miners. After that, he joined the United States Hockey League to play one season with the Sioux Falls Stampede. After being drafted by the Bruins, Swayman played college ice hockey for three seasons with the Maine Black Bears. Swayman had a .939 save percentage and 2.07 goals against average during the 2019–20 season, and he was awarded both the Hockey East Player of the Year award and the Mike Richter Award for the top collegiate goaltender.

Swayman left Maine after three years to join the Bruins. Due to the impacts of the COVID-19 pandemic, his professional hockey career did not begin until the  season. Swayman spent the first part of the season with the Providence Bruins of the AHL but was promoted to the NHL in April after Boston's primary goaltenders were sidelined by injury and illness. His performance in the remainder of the season led Bruce Cassidy to name Swayman Tuukka Rask's backup goaltender in the 2021 Stanley Cup playoffs, but he appeared in only one postseason game. Both Rask and Jaroslav Halák left the Bruins after the 2020–21 season, after which Swayman formed a goaltending platoon with Linus Ullmark.

Early life
Swayman was born on November 24, 1998, in Anchorage, Alaska, to Anne Boesenberg and Ken Swayman. He began watching college ice hockey games as an infant when his father would take him to watch the Alaska Anchorage Seawolves. Swayman first played as a goaltender when he was five years old, and he quickly became attached to the position. He played youth ice hockey around Anchorage and spent two years with the team at South Anchorage High School before starting his junior ice hockey career. He had expected to stay in Alaska and play for the Kenai River Brown Bears of the North American Hockey League, but he was cut from the team in favor of two older goaltenders. Instead, through the help of several family friends, Swayman joined the Pikes Peak Miners of the Rocky Mountain Junior Hockey League. In 18 games for the Miners, Swayman had a .940 save percentage (SV%) and a 1.79 goals against average (GAA).

After one season with the Miners, Swayman was selected by the Sioux Falls Stampede of the United States Hockey League in the 12th round of the 2016 USHL Phase II Draft. Sioux Falls coach Scott Owens had first taken notice of Swayman during his season in Pikes Peak, and he remained impressed by the goaltender during training camp. After leading all USHL goaltenders in preseason save percentage, Swayman stopped 48 shots on goal in his Stampede debut, a 3–2 shootout win over the Tri-City Storm. In 32 games with Sioux Falls, Swayman posted a 7–18–3 record, .914 SV%, and 2.90 GAA, and the NHL Central Scouting Bureau named him the No. 12 prospect among all North American goaltenders. At the end of the USHL season, the Boston Bruins of the National Hockey League (NHL) selected Swayman in the fourth round, 111th overall, of the 2017 NHL Entry Draft.

Playing career

Collegiate
At the time the Bruins drafted him, Swayman had already committed to playing college ice hockey for the University of Maine, beginning in the 2017–18 season. Swayman made his collegiate hockey debut on October 7, 2017, making 26 saves but taking the loss in Maine's 5–1 defeat against UConn. After making 40 saves to give the Black Bears a 5–2 win over Boston University on November 17, the Hockey East conference named Swayman their Rookie of the Week. He received the award again on January 8 after posting his first career shutout, stopping all 31 shots he faced in a 3–0 win over Boston University. He was named the Hockey East Rookie of the Month for the month of January after going 4–2–2 with a conference rookie-leading .928 SV% and 2.34 GAA in eight games. Swayman finished his freshman season with a .920 SV% and 2.74 GAA, while his 15–13–3 record was the best of any Maine rookie goaltender since Ben Bishop. He was named to the Hockey East All-Rookie Team and was an All-Star Honorable Mention.

Swayman's first Hockey East honor of the 2018–19 season came on November 19, when he was named the Defensive Player of the Week after making 79 saves in a two-game series against Boston University. He won the award again on December 3 after stopping 74 shots in a two-game series against Vermont. On January 25, Swayman made a career-high 53 saves in Maine's 4–3 upset win over UMass. After going 5–2–1 with a .918 SV% and 2.86 GAA in the month of February, with 30 or more saves in six of his outings, Swayman was named the Hockey East Goaltender of the Month. Swayman finished his sophomore season with a .919 SV%, a 2.77 GAA, and a 14–17–4 record in 35 games, and he was named to the All-Hockey East Third Team.

After a difficult start to the 2019–20 season, in which Swayman made 52 saves but Maine lost 7–0 to Providence, Swayman posted a .962 SV% and 1.22 GAA in the next six games. He was named the Hockey East Goaltender of the Month for February 2020 after going 4–2–1 with 210 saves for the month, including two shutouts. Swayman finished the season with an 18–11–5 record, .939 SV%, 2.07 GAA, and led all NCAA Division I goaltenders with 1,099 saves for the year. He earned a number of accolades at the end of the season, beginning with the Walter Brown Award, given to the top American-born college hockey player in New England. Hockey East named him a First-Team All-Star, the Goaltending Champion, and the Player of the Year. He was also an All-USCHO Second Team honoree, the first Maine goaltender to receive CCM/AHCA All-American East first-team honors since Spencer Abbott in 2012, and the New England Hockey Writers Association named him their Leonard Fowle New England MVP. He was the runner-up for the Hobey Baker Award, given to the top men's college ice hockey player in the United States, an honor which went that year to Scott Perunovich of the Minnesota Duluth Bulldogs. Swayman closed out the 2020 awards season with the Mike Richter Award, given to the top NCAA Division I men's ice hockey goaltender of the year.

At the conclusion of the 2019–20 season, Swayman announced that he would be leaving Maine to begin his professional hockey career with the Bruins. He finished his college career as Maine's all-time leader with 3,130 saves and 5,906:45 minutes played, while his 2.51 GAA was fifth in franchise history and his .927 SV% was behind only Jimmy Howard.

Professional

Swayman officially signed a three-year, entry-level contract with the Bruins on March 18, 2020. At the time, ice hockey at the NCAA, NHL, and American Hockey League (AHL) levels had all been suspended due to concerns surrounding the COVID-19 pandemic. As a result, Swayman's professional hockey career began in the  season, when he was assigned to the Providence Bruins, Boston's AHL affiliate. He won his first seven games of the season, posting a 1.57 GAA and .942 SV% in that time frame. In nine games for Providence, Swayman went 8–1–0 with a .933 SV% and 1.89 GAA, and he was named to the AHL Atlantic Division All-Star Team at the end of the season.

With Tuukka Rask sidelined by an upper-body injury and Jaroslav Halák testing positive for the COVID-19 virus, Swayman was promoted to make his NHL debut on April 6, 2021. He made 40 saves as the Bruins won 4–2 against the Philadelphia Flyers. His first NHL shutout, meanwhile, came on April 16, when he stopped all 25 shots he faced in the Bruins' 3–0 win over the New York Islanders. Swayman played in 10 games for the last six weeks of the Bruins' regular season, during which he went 7–3–0 with a .945 SV% and a 1.50 GAA. That regular-season performance prompted coach Bruce Cassidy to select Swayman over Halák as Rask's backup goaltender in the 2021 Stanley Cup playoffs. He made his postseason debut in Game 5 of the Bruins' second-round playoff series against the Islanders, relieving Rask for the third period. Swayman faced three shots, stopping two and allowing a Brock Nelson goal in a game that the Bruins lost 5–4. Cassidy opted not to play Swayman in Game 6, and the Bruins were eliminated from the playoffs with their 6–2 loss to the Islanders.

While Halák left the Bruins to join the Vancouver Canucks during the 2021 offseason, Rask underwent surgery to repair a torn hip labrum and was expected to miss the first half of the  season. Without their two veterans, the Bruins turned to Swayman and newcomer Linus Ullmark to platoon goaltending duties for the year. Through his first eight games of the season, Swayman was 5–3–0 with a .908 SV% and a 2.39 GAA, his numbers partially inflated by a five-goal outing against the Flyers on October 20. Rask returned to the Bruins on January 11, and Swayman, who was 8–6–2 with a .918 SV% and 2.26 GAA, was sent down to Providence to make room for the other goaltender. Rask soon suffered a setback in his recovery, and Swayman was promoted back to Boston at the end of January, a promotion that became permanent when Rask announced his retirement in February. After going 5–1–1 with a .960 SV%, a 1.13 GAA, and two shutouts in seven starts that month, Swayman was named the NHL Rookie of the Month for February 2022. Swayman finished the regular season with a 23–14–3 record in 40 games and led all rookie NHL goaltenders with a 2.37 GAA, .913 SV%, and three shutouts. The New England Sports Network and the Bruins awarded Swayman the 2022 Seventh Player Award, given annually to the player who "performs above and beyond expectations". The Bruins faced the Carolina Hurricanes in the first round of the 2022 Stanley Cup playoffs, with Swayman making his first postseason start in Game 3. He made 25 saves on 27 shots as Boston took the 4–2 victory. Swayman finished the seven-game series with a 2.63 GAA and .911 SV% in five appearances, but the Hurricanes eliminated the Bruins 3–2 in the winner-take-all match. Swayman finished in fifth place for the 2022 Calder Memorial Trophy and was also named to the NHL All-Rookie Team at goaltender.

International play

Swayman made his international ice hockey debut when he was selected to represent the United States junior team at the 2018 World Junior Ice Hockey Championships in Buffalo, New York. As the third goaltender behind Jake Oettinger and Joseph Woll, Swayman received limited playing time in the tournament outside of an exhibition game against Sweden and the bronze-medal match against the Czech Republic. Swayman played in the final 3 minutes and 19 seconds of the third-place game, allowing no goals as Team USA defeated the Czech Republic 9–3 to take the bronze medal.

Following an injury to Alex Nedeljkovic of the Detroit Red Wings, Swayman joined the United States national team for the 2022 IIHF World Championship in Finland. He recorded a shutout in his first World Championship appearance, stopping all 17 shots he faced in a 3–0 win over Great Britain. The United States team finished in fourth place, losing the bronze-medal match 8–4 to Czechia. Swayman allowed seven goals in the game but finished the tournament with a .909 SV%, 2.23 GAA, and two shutouts.

Personal life
During the 2021–22 NHL season, Swayman and fellow Bruins goaltender Linus Ullmark went viral for the hugs they gave each other after games. The ritual began after the Bruins won their home opener, after which Swayman said, "I don't think it's leaving, it was perfect".

Career statistics

Regular season and playoffs

International

Awards and honors

References

External links

 

1998 births
Living people
AHCA Division I men's ice hockey All-Americans
American ice hockey goaltenders
Boston Bruins draft picks
Boston Bruins players
Ice hockey people from Anchorage, Alaska
Jewish ice hockey players
Maine Black Bears men's ice hockey players
Providence Bruins players
Sioux Falls Stampede players